Poland has participated in the Eurovision Young Musicians 12 times since its debut in 1992 and has won the contest three times to date (1992, 2000, 2016). Poland hosted the contest in 1994.

Participation overview

Hostings

See also
Poland in the Eurovision Song Contest
Poland in the Eurovision Dance Contest
Poland in the Junior Eurovision Song Contest

References

External links
 Eurovision Young Musicians

Countries in the Eurovision Young Musicians